The 2022 United States House of Representatives elections in North Carolina were held on November 8, 2022, to elect U.S. representatives from the state of North Carolina, concurrent with nationwide elections to the House of Representatives and U.S. Senate (including in North Carolina), alongside legislative elections to the state house and senate. Primaries were held on May 17, 2022.

As a result of population growth over the preceding decade, the state's Congressional delegation increased from thirteen seats to fourteen in 2022. Republican-drawn districts adopted by the state legislature were struck down by the North Carolina Supreme Court as an unconstitutional partisan gerrymander, and court-drawn maps issued in their place. Democrats flipped the redrawn 13th district from Republican control, and won the newly created 14th district, yielding an even 7—7 House delegation.

District 1

The incumbent is Democrat G. K. Butterfield, who was re-elected with 54.2% of the vote in 2020.

The 1st district includes Vance, Warren, Franklin, Halifax, Northampton, Nash, Wilson, Edgecombe, Greene, Martin, Bertie, Hertford, Gates, Chowan, Perquimans, Pasquotank, Washington, and Tyrell counties. It also includes the majority of Pitt County.

Democratic primary

Candidates

Nominee
Don Davis, state senator from the 5th district

Eliminated in primary
Julian Bishop Sr.
Jason Spriggs, Henderson city councilor
Erica Smith, former state senator from the 3rd district and candidate for U.S. Senate in 2020 and 2022

Withdrawn
James Gailliard, state representative from the 25th district (running for re-election)

Declined
G. K. Butterfield, incumbent U.S. Representative (endorsed Davis)

Endorsements

Polling

Results

Republican primary

Candidates

Nominee
Sandy Smith, business owner, farmer, and nominee for this district in 2020

Eliminated in primary
Will Aiken, police officer and businessman
Brad Murphy, tech entrepreneur
Ernest Reeves, retired U.S. Army captain
Brent Roberson, businessman
Sandy Roberson, Mayor of Rocky Mount
Billy Strickland, attorney and former chairman of the Wayne County Republican Party
Henry Williams II, perennial candidate

Endorsements

Results

General election

Predictions

Polling

Generic Democrat vs. generic Republican

Results

District 2

The incumbent is Democrat Deborah Ross, who was elected with 63.0% of the vote in 2020.

The 2nd district includes most of Wake County, including the state capital of Raleigh and surrounding towns such as Apex and Cary.

Democratic primary

Candidates

Nominee
Deborah Ross, incumbent U.S. Representative

Republican primary

Candidates

Nominee
Christine Villaverde, disaster response consultant and former police officer

Eliminated in primary
Max Ganorkar, stay-at-home dad
Adina Safta, realtor

Results

General election

Endorsements

Predictions

Results

District 3

The incumbent is Republican Greg Murphy, who was re-elected with 63.4% of the vote in 2020.

The 3rd district includes Beaufort, Camden, Carteret, Craven, Currituck, Dare, Hyde, Jones, Lenoir, Pamlico, Sampson counties, as well as portions of Pitt and Wayne counties.

Republican primary

Candidates

Nominee
Greg Murphy, incumbent U.S. Representative

Eliminated in primary
Tony Cowden, small business owner
Eric Earhart
Brian Michael Friend
George Papastrat, business owner

Results

Endorsements

Democratic primary

Candidates

Nominee
Barbara Gaskins, nonprofit founder

Eliminated in primary
Joe Swartz, U.S. Army Veteran

Results

General election

Endorsements

Predictions

Results

District 4

The incumbent is Democrat David Price, who was re-elected with 67.3% of the vote in 2020. On October 18, 2021, he announced his retirement.

The 4th district includes Durham, Orange, Alamance, Granville, and Person counties, as well as a small section of Caswell County.

Democratic primary

Candidates

Nominee
Valerie Foushee, state senator (since 2013)

Eliminated in primary
Clay Aiken, former American Idol runner-up, activist, and nominee for NC-02 in 2014
Nida Allam, Durham County Commissioner (since 2020)
Crystal Cavalier
Matt Grooms
Stephen Valentine
Ashley Ward, Duke University Senior Policy Associate
Richard Watkins III, scientist and candidate for NC-04 in 2018

Withdrawn
Wiley Nickel, state senator (since 2019) (running in North Carolina's 13th congressional district)

Declined
Graig Meyer, state representative (since 2013)
Natalie Murdock, state senator (since 2020)
Zack Hawkins, state representative (since 2019)
David Price, incumbent U.S. Representative
Mike Woodward, state senator (since 2013)
Jessica Holmes, former Wake County Commissioner and nominee for Commissioner of Labor in 2020
Matt Hughes, Hillsborough Town Commissioner
Floyd McKissick Jr., former state senator (2007-2020)

Endorsements

Polling

Results

Republican primary

Candidates

Nominee
Courtney Geels, healthcare worker

Eliminated in primary
Robert Thomas

Endorsements

Results

General election

Predictions

Results

District 5

The incumbent is Republican Virginia Foxx, who was re-elected with 66.9% of the vote in 2020.

The 5th district includes Alleghany, Ashe, Avery, Davie, Mitchell, Stokes, Surry, Watauga, Wilkes, and Yadkin counties. It also includes portions of Caldwell and Forsyth counties.

Republican primary

Candidates

Nominee
Virginia Foxx, incumbent U.S. Representative

Eliminated in primary
Michael Ackerman, former CCSO deputy

Endorsements

Results

Democratic primary

Candidates

Nominee
Kyle Parrish, IT worker

General election

Endorsements

Predictions

Results

District 6

The incumbent is Democrat Kathy Manning, who was elected with 62.3% of the vote in 2020.

Democratic primary

Candidates

Nominee
Kathy Manning, incumbent U.S. Representative

Republican primary

Candidates

Nominee
Christian Castelli, Army Veteran

Eliminated in primary
Gerry Austin, former police officer
Marvin Boguslawski
Mary Ann Contogiannis
Lee Haywood, nominee for North Carolina's 6th congressional district in 2020
Laura Pichardo
Bill Schuch, former police officer

Endorsements

Results

Independents and third parties

Candidates

Declared
Thomas Watercott (Libertarian)

General election

Endorsements

Predictions

Polling

Results

District 7

The incumbent is Republican David Rouzer, who was re-elected with 60.2% of the vote in 2020.

The 7th district includes Bladen, Brunswick, Columbus, New Hanover, Pender, and Robeson counties, as well as a portion of Cumberland County.

Republican primary

Nominee 
David Rouzer, incumbent U.S. Representative

Eliminated in primary
Max Southworth-Beckwith, businessman and U.S. Marine veteran

Endorsements

Results

Democratic primary

Nominee 
Charles Graham, state representative (since 2011)

Eliminated in primary
Charles Evans, Cumberland County commissioner
Steve Miller, retired chemist
Yushonda Midgette

Withdrawn
Jason Minnicozzi, assistant public defender (running for N.C. Senate)

Endorsements

Results

General election

Predictions

Results

District 8

Due to redistricting, the incumbent is Republican Dan Bishop, who was re-elected with 55.6% of the vote in 2020.

Republican primary

Candidates

Nominee
Dan Bishop, incumbent U.S. Representative from North Carolina's 9th congressional district

Declined
Jon Hardister, state representative (running for re-election)
Richard Hudson, incumbent U.S. Representative (running in North Carolina's 9th congressional district)
Mark Walker, former U.S. Representative for North Carolina's 6th congressional district (2015–2021) (running for U.S. Senate)

Endorsements

Democratic primary

Candidates

Nominee
Scott Huffman, businessman and nominee for North Carolina's 13th congressional district in 2020

General election

Predictions

Results

District 9

Due to redistricting after the 2020 census, Republican Representatives Richard Hudson and Ted Budd were moved to the same district. Budd has declared his Candidacy for U.S. Senate.

Republican primary

Candidates

Nominee
Richard Hudson, incumbent U.S. Representative from North Carolina's 8th congressional district

Eliminated in primary
Michael Adriani
Jennyfer Bucardo, substitute teacher
Francisco Rios

Withdrawn
Peter Boykin, political commentator (running for NC House District 63)
Grayson Haff (running for NC House District 83)
Nat Robertson, former mayor of Fayetteville (2013-2017) (previously filed to run in the new 4th district drawn by the state legislature, then withdrew due to court redistricting)
John Szoka, state representative (since 2013) (running for Cumberland County Commissioner at-Large)

Declined
Dan Bishop, incumbent U.S. Representative (running in North Carolina's 8th congressional district)
Ted Budd, incumbent U.S. Representative (Running for U.S. Senate)

Endorsements

Results

Democratic primary

Candidates

Nominee
Ben Clark, state senator (since 2013)

Withdrawn
Maddie Parra, businesswoman

General election

Predictions

Results

District 10

The incumbent is Republican Patrick McHenry, who was re-elected with 68.9% of the vote in 2020.

Republican primary

Candidates

Nominee
Patrick McHenry, incumbent U.S. Representative

Eliminated in primary
Jeff Gregory
Michael Magnotta
Gary Robinson
Richard Speer, U.S. Army Veteran

Declined
Tim Moore, Speaker of the North Carolina House of Representatives (2015–present)

Endorsements

Results

Democratic primary

Candidates

Nominee
Pam Genant, nurse and former Army officer

Eliminated in primary
Michael Felder

Endorsements

Results

General election

Predictions

Results

District 11

The incumbent is Republican Madison Cawthorn, who was elected with 54.5% of the vote in 2020.

The 11th district includes Cherokee, Graham, Clay, Macon, Swain, Jackson, Haywood, Transylvania, Henderson, Buncombe, Madison, Yancey, Polk, and McDowell counties, as well as the western half of Rutherford County.

Republican primary

Nominee 
Chuck Edwards, state senator

Eliminated in primary
Matthew Burril
Madison Cawthorn, incumbent U.S. Representative
Rod Honeycutt, former U.S. Army colonel
Wendy Nevarez, social security claims specialist and U.S. Navy veteran
Bruce O'Connell, hotel manager
Kristie Sluder
Michele Woodhouse, North Carolina Republican Party District Chair for NC-11

Withdrawn
Eric Batchelor, Haywood County deputy sheriff

Declined
Kevin Corbin, state senator

Endorsements

Polling

Results

Democratic primary

Candidates

Nominee
Jasmine Beach-Ferrara, Buncombe County commissioner

Eliminated in primary
Jay Carey, U.S. Army veteran
Katie Dean, auto repair shop owner
Marco Gutierrez
Bo Hess, psychotherapist
Bynum Lunsford

Withdrawn
Eric Gash, pastor
Josh Remillard, veteran (running for N.C. House)
Brooker Smith, U.S. Air Force veteran

Endorsements

Independents and third parties

Candidates

Declared
David Coatney (Libertarian)

General election

Predictions

Polling

Results

District 12

The incumbent is Democrat Alma Adams, who was re-elected unopposed in 2020.

Democratic primary

Candidates

Nominee
Alma Adams, incumbent U.S. Representative

Eliminated in primary
John Sharkey

Endorsements

Results

Republican primary

Candidates

Nominee
Tyler Lee, real estate investor

Eliminated in primary
Andrew Huffman
Nalini Joseph

Results

General election

Predictions

Results

District 13

Due to redistricting after the 2020 census, this is a new district with no incumbent.

The 13th district includes all of Johnston County, the southern half of Wake County, the western half of Wayne County, and the eastern half of Harnett County.

Republican primary

Candidates

Nominee
Bo Hines, former college football player

Eliminated in primary
DeVan Barbour, RNC Delegate
Kelly Daughtry, attorney and daughter of N. Leo Daughtry
Renee Ellmers, former U.S. Representative for North Carolina's 2nd congressional district (2011–2017) and candidate for Lieutenant Governor in 2020
Kent Keirsey, businessman and U.S. Army reserve officer
Jessica Morel
Chad Slotta, businessman
Kevin Alan Wolff

Endorsements

Polling

Results

Democratic primary

Candidates

Nominee
Wiley Nickel, state senator (since 2019) (previously filed to run in North Carolina's 4th congressional district)

Eliminated in primary
Jamie Campbell Bowles
Nathan Click, Air Force veteran and small business owner
Denton Lee, teacher and unaffiliated candidate for North Carolina's 26th General Assembly District in 2020
Sam Searcy, former state senator  (2019–2020)

Endorsements

Results

General election

Predictions

Polling 
Aggregate polls

Graphical summary

Generic Republican vs. generic Democrat

Results

District 14

Due to redistricting after the 2020 census, this is a new district with no incumbent.

Democratic primary

Candidates

Nominee
Jeff Jackson, state senator from the 37th district (2014–present) (previously ran for U.S. Senate)

Eliminated in primary
Ramin Mammadov, quality assurance manager

Declined
Malcolm Graham, Member of the Charlotte City Council from the 2nd district (2019–present) and 1st district (1999–2004), former state senator from the 40th district (2005–2015)
Brandon Lofton, state representative from the 104th district (2019–present) (running for re-election)
Vi Lyles, Mayor of Charlotte (2017–present), former Mayor Pro Tempore of Charlotte (2015–2017) (running for re-election)
Julie Eiselt, Mayor Pro Tem of Charlotte (2017–present), At-Large Member of the Charlotte City Council (2015–present)
Chaz Beasley, former state representative from the 92nd district (2017–2021), candidate for Lieutenant Governor in 2020
Dan McCready, former U.S. Marine, businessman, and nominee for North Carolina's 9th congressional district in 2018 and 2019

Results

Republican primary

Candidates

Nominee
Pat Harrigan, businessman and Green Beret

Eliminated in primary
Jonathan Simpson, entrepreneur and infantry officer in the United States Army National Guard

Results

General election

Endorsements

Predictions

Results

Notes

Partisan clients

References

External links
Official campaign websites for 1st district candidates
Don Davis (D) for Congress
Sandy Smith (R) for Congress

Official campaign websites for 2nd district candidates
Deborah Ross (D) for Congress
Christine Villaverde (R) for Congress

Official campaign websites for 3rd district candidates
Barbara Gaskins (D) for Congress
Greg Murphy (R) for Congress

Official campaign websites for 4th district candidates
Valerie Foushee (D) for Congress
Courtney Geels (R) for Congress

Official campaign websites for 5th district candidates
Virginia Foxx (R) for Congress
Kyle Parrish (D) for Congress

Official campaign websites for 6th district candidates
Christian Castelli (R) for Congress
Kathy Manning (D) for Congress

Official campaign websites for 7th district candidates
Charles Graham (D) for Congress
David Rouzer (R) for Congress

Official campaign websites for 8th district candidates
Dan Bishop (R) for Congress
Scott Huffman (D) for Congress

Official campaign websites for 9th district candidates
Ben Clark (D) for Congress
Richard Hudson (R) for Congress

Official campaign websites for 10th district candidates
Pam Genant (D) for Congress
Patrick McHenry (R) for Congress

Official campaign websites for 11th district candidates
Jasmine Beach-Ferrara (D) for Congress
Chuck Edwards (R) for Congress

Official campaign websites for 12th district candidates
Alma Adams (D) for Congress
Tyler Lee (R) for Congress

Official campaign websites for 13th district candidates
Bo Hines (R) for Congress
Wiley Nickel (D) for Congress

Official campaign websites for 14th district candidates
Pat Harrigan (R) for Congress
Jeff Jackson (D) for Congress

2022
North Carolina
United States House of Representatives